Jeet Ki Zid is a web television series which premiered on ZEE5 on January 22, 2021. The seven-part series is directed by Vishal Mangalorkar. It is based on the life of a retired Indian Army special forces officer Major Deependra Singh Sengar played by Amit Sadh.

Plot 
The series is based on the true story of a Special Forces Officer, Major Deep Singh who was left paralysed waist below during the Kargil War, but his relentless attitude helped him bounce back in life. The narrative revolves around Deep’s journey during different timelines— (1987) when he loses his elder brother Rajat to a terrorist attack, (1996) when he joins the Special Forces Training Centre and (1999) when he is posted in Jammu & Kashmir.

Cast 

 Amit Sadh as Major Deependra Singh Sengar (Para SF)
 Amrita Puri as Jaya
 Sushant Singh as Colonel Ranjeet Chaudhary (Para SF)
 Aly Goni as Surya Sethi
 Gagan Randhawa as Dipti
 Mrinal Kulkarni

Episodes

Reception 
Mimansa Shekhar from The Indian Express stated "Jeet Ki Zid plays well in silences or without many dialogues in the most tense situations." Udita Jhunjhunwala from Scroll.in wrote "A heartening story of persistence and fortitude, Jeet Ki Zid is as much a tribute to that invisible army." Archika Khurana from Times Of India gave the series 3.5 stars out of 5 and reviewed the series as an inspiring tale of self-belief and determination.

References

Further reading 
 Sudhir Gore (20 March 2008). "Soldier of fortune". Business Today

External links 
 
 Jeet Ki Zid on ZEE5

Indian web series
Hindi-language web series